RCAF Station Carberry was a Second World War air training station located near Carberry, Manitoba, Canada.

History

World War II
The Royal Air Force (RAF), opened No. 33 Service Flying Training School (SFTS) here in December 1940. As with all RAF training facilities in Canada, the station was subject to Royal Canadian Air Force (RCAF) administrative and operational control and formally became part of the British Commonwealth Air Training Plan in 1942. The school closed in November 1944.

Aerodrome information 
The airfield was one of the few double-sided aerodromes built for wartime training with six parallel runways formed in a triangle rather than the typical three runways formed in a triangle.
Six runways were listed as follows:

Relief landing field – Petrel
A relief landing field for RCAF Station Carberry was located approximately 8 Miles north. The relief field was constructed in the typical triangular pattern. 
Three runways were listed as follows:

A review of Google Maps on 8 June 2018 shows no visibility of the airfield.

Relief landing field – Oberon
The probable second relief landing field for RCAF Station Carberry was located approximately 15 miles north. The relief field was listed as turf with a triangular runway layout. 
The aerodrome was listed as an All way field with three runways, they were listed as follows:

A review of Google Maps on 8 June 2018 shows no visibility of an airfield near the posted coordinates.

Postwar
After the war the station was used as a storage depot until the RCAF moved out.

Current use
The site is now the location of a McCain Foods potato processing facility.

See also
Carberry, Manitoba
Rural Municipality of North Cypress
Camp Hughes

References

External links
Bruce Forsyth's Canadian Military History Page

Carberry
Military airbases in Manitoba
Military history of Manitoba
Carberry